Hickman Mills C-1 School District (HMC-1) is a school district headquartered in Kansas City, Missouri, serving Hickman Mills. The enrollment is approximately 5,600 students.  It was the first consolidated (hence the C-1) school district in Missouri.

Schools
High schools:
 Ruskin High School

Middle:
 Smith-Hale Middle School

Elementary:
 Compass Elementary School 
 Ingels Elementary School
 Millennium at Santa Fe Elementary School
 Truman Elementary School
 Warford Elementary School

Preschool:
 Ervin Early Learning Center
 Freda Markley Early Childhood Center

Other:
 Burke Academy
 Crittenton Center

Closed:
 Hickman Mills High School
 Johnson Elementary School
 Symington Elementary School, which was opened in 1958, closed in 2019, and is named for the former Missouri Senator Stuart Symington

References

Further reading
 Parkison, Jami, & Hickman Mills C-1 School District, The Journey to our Future; The History of Hickman Mills C-1 School District, 1902-2002 (2002).

External links
 
Education in Kansas City, Missouri
Education in Jackson County, Missouri
School districts in Missouri